Continuing medical education (CME) is continuing education (CE) that helps those in the medical field maintain competence and learn about new and developing areas of their field. These activities may take place as live events, written publications, online programs, audio, video, or other electronic media. Content for these programs is developed, reviewed, and delivered by faculty who are experts in their individual clinical areas.  Similar to the process used in academic journals, any potentially conflicting financial relationships for faculty members must be both disclosed and resolved in a meaningful way. However, critics complain that drug and device manufacturers often use their financial sponsorship to bias CMEs towards marketing their own products.

Historical context
Continuing medical education is not a new concept. From essentially the beginning of institutionalized medical instruction (medical instruction affiliated with medical colleges and teaching hospitals), health practitioners continued their learning by meeting with their peers. Grand rounds, case discussions, and meetings to discuss published medical papers constituted the continuing learning experience. In the 1950s through to the 1980s, CME was increasingly funded by the pharmaceutical industry. Concerns regarding informational bias (both intentional and unintentional) led to increasing scrutiny of the CME funding sources. This led to the establishment of certifying agencies such as the Society for Academic Continuing Medical Education which is an umbrella organization representing medical associations and bodies of academic medicine from the United States, Canada, Great Britain and Europe. The pharmaceutical industry has also developed guidelines regarding drug detailing and industry sponsorship of CME, such as the Pharmaceutical Advertising Advisory Board (PAAB) and Canada's Research-Based Pharmaceutical Companies (Rx&D).

Requirements 
In the United States, many states require CME for medical professionals to maintain their licenses. Within the United States, CME for physicians is regulated by the Accreditation Council for Continuing Medical Education (ACCME) and the American Osteopathic Association (AOA).

In Canada, certification is provided by the Royal College of Physicians and Surgeons of Canada (RCPSC) and the College of Family Physicians of Canada (CFPC).  The RCPSC is responsible for the development and implementation of all certifying examinations in each specialty other than Family Medicine. Specialist physicians who join the Royal College as Fellows maintain their knowledge, skills, competence and performance through participating in the Maintenance of Certification Program.  For each five-year cycle, fellows of the college are required to document 400 credits, with a minimum of 40 credits obtained in each year of the cycle.  Credits are earned at one to two credits per hour, based on the type of learning activity.  The CFPC requires 250 credit-hours over a five-year cycle.  Fifty credits must be obtained for each year of the cycle.  To earn and maintain fellowship within the college, an additional 24 credit-hours of higher level learning are also required over each learning cycle.  Similarly, each province and territory requires documentation of ongoing CME for licensure.

Production of CME courses
Continuing medical education activities are developed and delivered by a variety of organizations, including:
 Professional associations
 Medical education agencies
 Hospitals
 Educational institutions, including universities, medical and nursing schools
 Home study nursing continuing education providers

Activities may be classified as Formal Learning Activities, including live planned programs, enduring materials (such as DVD- and web-based content), Process Improvement CME (or PI-CME, as defined by the American Medical Association), or Informal Learning Activities such as Internet-Point of Care (POC) research and decision making, or journal clubs whose members evaluate published research for mutual awareness and benefit, or online professional communities.

In 2008, professional certification for CME planners was established by the National Commission for Certification of CME Professionals which is earned by standardized exam, and confers the Certified CME Professional (CCMEP) certificate. NC-CME maintains a registry of these certified professionals. As of June 2011, the Registry included 320 professionals.

Criticism of industry sponsorship

Critics, such as Morris and Taitsman, would prefer that the medical profession eliminate commercial support for CME.

Despite ACCME requirements that program content be free of commercial interests, "CME providers can easily pitch topics designed to attract commercial sponsorship," and sponsors can award grants to programs that support their marketing strategies. The Institute of Medicine has said that CME has become too reliant on industry funding that "tends to promote a narrow focus on the products and to neglect provisions of a broader education on alternative strategies," such as communication and prevention.

For example, gabapentin (Neurontin), was approved by the U.S. Food and Drug Administration for adjunctive therapy in epilepsy, but Warner-Lambert sponsored CME activities that encouraged its use for off-label indications. The U.S. Department of Justice brought civil and criminal charges against Warner-Lambert, which Warner-Lambert settled for $430 million, alleging that Warner-Lambert paid kickbacks to doctors in the form of lavish trips to attend presentations about off-label uses. More recently, AstraZeneca PLC has been fined $520 million in the United States for off-label promotion to doctors for their anti-psychotic drug, Seroquel.

Industry-sponsored CMEs can violate federal statutes, according to the U.S. Department of Health and Human Services. "When a pharmaceutical manufacturer rewards high-prescribing physicians by directing a CME provider to pay (or overpay) them as CME faculty, consultants, or members of a speaker's bureau," wrote Morris and Taitsman.

CMEs also work alongside the medical-industrial complex, which describes the connection between pharmaceutical companies, healthcare corporations, and physicians in creating for-profit healthcare products. Physicians who undergo continuing medical education courses can oftentimes be subject to bias due to pharmaceutical companies and healthcare corporations promoting products throughout the course. This can create poor outcomes for patients, who are oftentimes subject to physician bias and potentially detrimental effects.

References 

Medical education
Medical